Martina is a 1949 West German drama film directed by Arthur Maria Rabenalt, and starring Jeanette Schultze, Cornell Borchers, and Siegmar Schneider. It was shot at the Tempelhof Studios in Berlin. The film's sets were designed by the art directors Willi Herrmann and Gabriel Pellon.

Cast
Jeanette Schultze as Martina
Cornell Borchers as Irene
Siegmar Schneider as Volker
Albert Hehn as Donny
Werner Hinz as Professor Rauscher
Arno Paulsen as Kuchenreuther
Antonie Jaeckel
Kurt Vespermann
Margarete Kupfer
Dieter Angermann
Reinhard Kolldehoff

References

External links

West German films
German drama films
1949 drama films
Films directed by Arthur Maria Rabenalt
Films about prostitution in Germany
German black-and-white films
Films shot at Tempelhof Studios
1940s German films
1940s German-language films